The 2020 South Dakota Coyotes football team represented the University of South Dakota in the 2020–21 NCAA Division I FCS football season. They were led by fifth-year head coach Bob Nielson and played their home games in the DakotaDome. They played as a member of the Missouri Valley Football Conference.

Previous season

The Coyotes finished the 2019 season 5–7, 4–4 in MVFC play to finish in sixth place.

Schedule

References

South Dakota
South Dakota Coyotes football seasons
South Dakota Coyotes football